The Sickness is the debut studio album by American heavy metal band Disturbed. It was released on March 7, 2000, by Giant and Reprise Records. The album peaked at number 29 on the US Billboard 200, and spent a total of 106 weeks on the chart. It was Disturbed's only album to not hit number one on the US Billboard 200 until their seventh album Evolution debuted at number 4 in 2018. In 2018, The Sickness was certified five times platinum by the RIAA for shipments of over five million copies in the US, making it the band's most successful album.

Background and recording
The Sickness was Disturbed's first studio release since the band's formation in 1994. Reflecting on the band's early days, lead vocalist David Draiman said in a 2015 interview, "People think it was like this meteoric rise. It really wasn't. We beat the hell out of ourselves for two or three years as a local band, our own self-promotional mega-machine, every band member in a different venue of the city every time a rock show would come through town, passing out our promotional material — cassettes, stickers, t-shirts, whatever we could. [This was] in addition to playing strategically where we thought it made sense and in addition to building our following on the south side of Chicago. So there was a long period of time before that and a lot of struggle in a city that wasn't conducive to hard rock and heavy metal. Chicago was an alternative town. It was Smashing Pumpkins, Local H. It was not metal. So we were blacklisted. We couldn't even play inner-city clubs. We weren't cool enough. We were too metal. That was something that wasn't considered cool enough. We had to force our way in."

However, as the late 1990s brought a shift in focus in the rock industry toward a heavier sound, the band secured a record deal with Giant Records and Disturbed got their big break. Prior to the album's recording, the band sought to refine its sound. Lead guitarist Dan Donegan took a different approach than usual and adopted a style that did not incorporate guitar solos: "In the beginning, before we were even signed, I'd solo all over the place and it didn't really work, so I pretty much cut out the solos altogether until the last album or two. That's the way it's worked with us. Over time we've pushed each other to become better musicians," Donegan said in a 2011 interview with Guitar World.

According to Draiman, it was challenging for him to become comfortable with writing about the personal themes contained throughout the album's lyrics, saying, "It's very frightening. Because here you go, you've decided to be open and bare a part of your soul to these people, and lay it out on a platter for them to observe. So until you know that the listeners are getting any part of what you're saying, it's incredibly frightening."

With Draiman on vocals and Donegan on guitar, the two were joined by Mike Wengren on drums and Steve "Fuzz" Kmak on bass. Seeking help with the album's production process, the band turned to producer Johnny K, who had gone to high school with Donegan's brother. By the time work on the album had started, a bond had already formed and Johnny K had begun working with the band as the producer for their album. In an interview with Guitar Edge, Johnny K spoke about the process, saying, "They fought hard to get me to do their record. They didn't want to go to L.A. and make a record that wouldn't be any better than their demos. I felt that with a budget and time, I could make a record everyone would really like [...] I pushed them as hard as I could, and we felt successful before it sold one copy. All of that hard work, and the fact that they are such a good band, made it easy for me to get other jobs. People liked it and would say, 'Who did the Disturbed album? Let's get him.'"

Recording sessions took place in late 1999, and on March 7, 2000, The Sickness was released; however, the album was not an instant success. The lead single from the album, "Stupify", was released in April of 2000. "[It] was actually a hard sell at radio," Draiman said. "It's not like it shot up. They worked it. Giant Records at the time, they worked it. They pushed it to where it got enough awareness that it did start to chart decently." The track addressed themes of racism and discrimination, loosely based on one of Draiman's own experiences. It would go on to reach No. 12 on the Mainstream Rock chart and No. 10 on Modern Rock and remains one of their most popular songs. It was followed by the singles "Down with the Sickness" in October of the same year, "Voices" the following November, and "The Game" in February 2001.

Reissues

10th anniversary
On March 23, 2010, a reissue of the album was released that was remastered, slightly remixed and includes B-sides, new artwork, and exclusive online content. This reissue celebrates the tenth anniversary of the release of the album and is available for the first time in Standard Black vinyl format.

Disturbed's guitarist, Dan Donegan, commented on the reissue: "[...] it's the album that put us on the map and launched our career. So we went back into the studio and we remixed it, we're having it remastered, we're gonna put a couple of bonus tracks on there and touch up some of the packaging and the artwork. Just a little collector's item, a little tribute to that album for the fans".

The two songs included in the reissue, "God of the Mind" and "A Welcome Burden", are also included in a B-side compilation called The Lost Children.

20th anniversary
In January 2020, Disturbed announced that they were going on tour for The Sickness 20th Anniversary Tour with Staind and Bad Wolves. The tour was canceled due to the COVID-19 pandemic. The Sickness was re-released to mark the album's 20th anniversary. It includes all of the original songs remastered and live versions of the songs. The Sickness 20th Anniversary Tour was rescheduled for July and September 2021 but was once again canceled due to the COVID-19 pandemic and restrictions.

Critical reception

The album received positive reviews upon release. Steve Huey from AllMusic commented "But even if it has a few less-than-compelling moments, The Sickness overall comes off as the work of a band who really doesn't have far to go to achieve total control of its sound and compositional skills, and that makes it a terrific debut album."

Accolades
In 2013, Loudwire featured The Sickness in their "Top 25 Debut Hard Rock Albums" list, placing the album at number 24. 

In 2020, it was named one of the 20 best metal albums of 2000 by Metal Hammer magazine.

In 2021, the album was put on the list of the Revolver magazine "20 Essential Nu-Metal Albums".

Soundtrack appearances
 "Voices" appeared in one of the trailers for the horror film Jeepers Creepers.
 "The Game" appeared in the English adaptation of Dragon Ball Z: Cooler's Revenge.
 "Stupify" and "Fear" appeared in an English adaptation of Dragon Ball Z: Lord Slug.
 "Down with the Sickness" appeared in several films, TV episodes, and video games, including The One, Queen of the Damned, the 2004 remake of Dawn of the Dead, The Death of Dick Long, Green Street, the Brooklyn Nine-Nine episode "Sicko", the South Park episode "With Apologies to Jesse Jackson", Rock Band 2, Guitar Hero 5, Guitar Hero Live, WWE 2K18, and other media. The Guitar Hero 5 and Rock Band 2 versions have the "abuse" segment intact, however, all profane language was removed. Guitar Hero Live also features this song in the GH On Demand feature of the game, however as the music video version of the song is the version that is used, the "abuse" segment is not featured. Professional wrestler Christopher Chri$ Ca$h Bauman also used "Down with the Sickness" as his theme song from 2001 - 2005 in CZW until his death in an automobile accident on August 18, 2005. As of 2005, Combat Zone Wrestling annually run a memorial tribute event for Bauman titled "Down with the Sickness" after his theme song. The show originally started as a double header afternoon show, with another CZW event taking place later in the evening. Many former CZW trainees have made appearances on past events, including longtime friend GQ, who has wrestled on all of the events.

Track listing

Personnel

Disturbed
 David Draiman – vocals
 Dan Donegan – guitars, keyboards, programming
 Steve Kmak – bass
 Mike Wengren – drums, percussion, programming

Production
 Disturbed – production
 Johnny K – engineering, production
 Tadpole – engineering
 Frank De Lamora – programming
 Enrique Santiago – programming
 Andy Wallace – mixing
 Steve Sisco – mixdown engineering
 Howie Weinberg – mastering
 P.R. Brown –  art direction, design, cover and object photography
 Jana Leon – band photography

10th anniversary edition (2010)
 Neal Avron – mixing
 Ted Jensen – mastering

International edition live tracks
 Tim Powell and Bif Dawes for Westwood One – engineering
 Recorded in Chicago, IL on March 10, 2000 at The Metro

Charts

Weekly charts

Year-end charts

Decade-end charts

Singles

Certifications

References

2000 debut albums
Albums produced by Johnny K
Disturbed (band) albums
Giant Records (Warner) albums
Reprise Records albums